Hibiscus syriacus is a species of flowering plant in the mallow family, Malvaceae. It is native to Korea, and south-central and southeast China, but widely introduced elsewhere, including much of Asia. It was given the epithet syriacus because it had been collected from gardens in Syria. Common names include the rose of Sharon, (especially in North America), Syrian ketmia, shrub althea, and rose mallow (in the United Kingdom). It is the national flower of South Korea and is mentioned in the South Korean national anthem.

Description
Hibiscus syriacus is a hardy deciduous shrub. It is upright and vase-shaped, reaching  in height, bearing large trumpet-shaped flowers with prominent yellow-tipped white stamens. The flowers are often pink in color, but can also be dark pink (almost purple), light pink or white.  Individual flowers are short-lived, lasting only a day.  However, numerous buds produced on the shrub's new growth provide prolific flowering over a long summer blooming period.  The soil in which the Hibiscus thrives on is a moist, but well-drained, mixture of sand, clay, chalk, and loam. Hibiscus syriacus is highly tolerant of air pollution, heat, humidity, poor soil and drought. The species has naturalized very well in many suburban areas, and might even be termed slightly invasive, so frequently it does seed around.

Growth
The branches are thin and gray, white-lenticeled, with raised leaf scars and small buds. The leaves appear unusually late in the season, in May. They have three distinct lobes with coarsely-toothed margins.

Flowers

H. syriacus has 5-petaled flowers (to  diameter) in solid colors of white, red, purple, mauve, violet, or blue, or bicolors with a different colored throat, depending upon the cultivar. Extending from the base of these five petals is the pistil at the center, with the stamen around it. These basic characteristics give the H. syriacus flower and its many variants their distinctive form. The plant can bloom continuously from July through September, usually at night. With maturity, flexible plant stems become weighted under the load of prolific summer flowers, and bend over halfway to the ground.

Fruits and seeds 
Most modern cultivars are virtually fruitless. The fruits of those that have them are green or brown, ornamentally unattractive 5-valved dehiscent capsules, which persist throughout much of the winter on older cultivars. They will eventually shatter over the course of the dormant season and spread their easily germinating seeds around the base of the parent plant, forming colonies with time.

Cultivation

Though it has no fall color and can be stiff and ungainly if badly pruned, H. syriacus remains a popular ornamental shrub today, with many cultivars. Full-grown plants can tolerate a wide range of conditions, including frost, drought and urban pollution. However, the best results are produced in a warm, sheltered position; a well-drained neutral soil; and full sun.

Propagation
Hibiscus syriacus is fairly easily propagated from either seeds, with variable results, or by layering or cuttings, cloning the original.

Pests and diseases
Old shrubs can develop trunk cankers that may eventually prove fatal to the plant. The plant has some susceptibility to leaf spots, blights, rusts and canker. Japanese beetles, whiteflies and aphids are occasional insect visitors. Japanese beetles can severely damage foliage if left unchecked.

Cultivars
The following cultivars have gained the Royal Horticultural Society's Award of Garden Merit: 

='Notwood3' (blue, semi-double)
'Diana' (single, white)
'Hamabo' (pale pink, red centre)
='Notwoodone' (pale lilac)
'Meehanii' (pink, variegated leaves)
'Oiseau Bleu'('Blue Bird') (blue-violet, maroon centre)
'Red Heart' (white, red centre)
='Notwoodtwo' (white, double)
'William R. Smith' (white, single)
'Woodbridge' (deep pink)

National flower

Hibiscus syriacus, also known as the Korean rose, is the national flower of South Korea. The flower appears in national emblems, and Korea is compared poetically to the flower in the South Korean national anthem. The flower's name in Korean is mugunghwa (Hangul: 무궁화; Hanja: 無窮花) or mokkeunhwa (Hangul: 목근화; Hanja: 木槿花). The flower's symbolic significance stems from the Korean word mugung, which means "eternity" or "inexhaustible abundance". Various state emblems of South Korea contain Hibiscus syriacus; it is generally considered by South Koreans to be a traditional symbol of the Korean people and culture.

History and culture 

Hibiscus syriacus  was originally endemic to China. It is recorded that it was brought to Japan in the 8th century and cultivated for horticulture. According to records, it was introduced to the Korean Peninsula around the 15th or 16th century. its leaves were brewed into an herbal tea and its flowers eaten in Korea. Later on it was introduced and grown in the gardens of Europe as early as the 16th century, though as late as 1629 John Parkinson thought it was tender and took great precautions with it, thinking it "would not suffer to be uncovered in the Winter time, or yet abroad in the Garden, but kept in a large pot or tubbe in the house or in a warme cellar, if you would have them to thrive." (sic) By the end of the 17th century, some knew it to be hardy: Gibson, describing Lord Arlington's London house noted six large earthen pots coddling the "tree hollyhock", as he called it, "that grows well enough in the ground". By the 18th century the shrub was common in English gardens and in the North American colonies, known as Althea frutex and "Syrian ketmia".

References

Further reading

External links

 
 How to Grow a Rose of Sharon

syriacus
Flora of China
Medicinal plants of Asia
Garden plants
South Korean culture
National symbols of South Korea
Plants described in 1753
Taxa named by Carl Linnaeus